Charles Adams, born Karl Adam Schwanbeck (December 19, 1845 – August 19, 1895), was a United States Army officer, US Indian agent, diplomat and businessman. In 1879 he secured the release of five hostages taken captive by the White River Utes after the Meeker Massacre, and held an official inquiry into their treatment. In 1880 he was appointed minister to Bolivia, where he served for two years. Returning to Colorado, he became involved in mining and water development.

Early life and education
Born in Anklam, Pomerania, Germany in 1845, Charles was the son of cabinetmaker Karl Heinrich and Maria J. Mackman Schwanbeck. His family immigrated to the United States after the Revolutions of 1848 in Germany.

Career

Schwanbeck fought as a young man in the late years of the American Civil War. After the war he migrated to the Colorado Territory.  About 1870, he was appointed a brigadier general of the Colorado Militia, by when he had changed his surname to Adams.  In addition, he was appointed as US Indian Agent to the Ute Tribe, serving through 1874. There were distinct groups of Utes in Colorado, although settlers often could not distinguish them. Adams dealt primarily with the White Rivers and Uncompahgre Utes.

During these years, Adams established good relationships with Chief Ouray and his wife Chipeta of the Uncompahgre Utes.  This friendship was useful in helping him negotiate the release of five captives (three women and two children) taken by the Utes in 1879 after the Meeker Massacre, as part of the White River War.  In 1875 Adams was appointed a post office inspector but he also continued with the militia.

Marriage and family
Adams dropped the Schwanbeck surname sometime around 1870, when he married Margaret Thompson Phelps.

Diplomat
In 1880, Adams was appointed the United States minister to Bolivia.  In that position, he served as the arbitrator of conferences on the Bolivia and Chile Wars.  He remained in that position through 1882.

Returning to Colorado with the change in presidential administrations, Adams became engaged in the manufacture of glass, and mining and mineral water development.  He died on August 19, 1895 in the Gumry Hotel disaster in Denver, Colorado when a boiler in the basement of the hotel exploded, destroying the building and killing more than 20 people. He is interred in the Crystal Valley Cemetery in Manitou Springs, Colorado.

References
Who Was Who in America: Historical Volume, 1607-1896. Chicago: Quincy Who's Who, 1963.

1845 births
1895 deaths
Ambassadors of the United States to Bolivia
Businesspeople from Denver
People from the Province of Pomerania
German emigrants to the United States
19th-century American diplomats
Accidental deaths in Colorado
Deaths from fire in the United States
United States Indian agents
19th-century American businesspeople